Warren Woodrow "Woody" Hoburg (born September 16, 1985) is an American engineer and NASA astronaut.

Early life and education
Warren Hoburg was born on September 16, 1985, in Pittsburgh, Pennsylvania, to Jim and Peggy Hoburg.   While attending North Allegheny High School he participated in the first-ever Team America Rocketry Challenge and competed in the national finals. He received a Bachelor of Science degree in aeronautics and astronautics at the Massachusetts Institute of Technology in 2008. He earned a Master of Science in 2011, followed by a Ph.D. in 2013, in electrical engineering and computer science at the University of California, Berkeley.

Academic career
After completing his doctorate, Hoburg worked in product development at Boeing until 2014, when he became an assistant professor at MIT. He served as a sponsor for the capstone project Jungle Hawk Owl, which is a UAV sponsored by the US Air Force.  He also manages the geometric programming Python package GPKit.

NASA career
In 2017, Hoburg was selected as an astronaut candidate in NASA Astronaut Group 22, and began the two-year training in August. In December 2020 he was announced as one of the eighteen NASA astronauts selected as part of the Artemis Program for a lunar mission in 2024.

He was the pilot of SpaceX Crew-6  that launched on March 2, 2023.

Personal life
Hoburg is an avid rock climber, mountaineer, and pilot. He has previously worked with Yosemite Search & Rescue  and the Bay Area Mountain Rescue Unit.

Awards and honors
Hoburg was a National Science Foundation research fellow from 2009–2013, and is a two-time recipient of the AIAA Aeronautics and Astronautics Teaching Award.

References

1985 births
Living people
American aerospace engineers
American astronauts
American aviators
Engineers from Pennsylvania
Massachusetts Institute of Technology faculty
MIT School of Engineering alumni
People from Pittsburgh
UC Berkeley College of Engineering alumni